Kay Sekimachi (born September 30, 1926) is an American fiber artist and weaver, best known for her three-dimensional woven monofilament hangings as well as her intricate baskets and bowls.

Early life and education
Kay Sekimachi was born in San Francisco on September 30, 1926 to first generation Japanese Americans Takao Sekimachi and Wakuri Sekimachi. After the signing of Executive Order 9066, Sekimachi was interned with her family at Tanforan Assembly Center and then the Topaz War Relocation Center from 1942 to 1944.

From 1946 to 1949 she attended the California College of the Arts (formerly California College of Arts and Crafts), where she initially studied painting, design, and silkscreening. After she visited the weaving room and saw students working on looms, she spent her entire savings on a loom the following day though she did not know anything about weaving. She started her art career weaving clothing and two-dimensional wall pieces. She heard Trude Guermonprez speak at Pond Farm In the summer of 1954 Sekimachi returned to CCAC to study with Guermonprez of whom she said "Trude opened my eyes that weavings don't have to be utilitarian." The student teacher relationship eventually became a deep friendship.  Guermonprez challenged Sekimachi, leading her to take on more complex artistic projects. Sekimachi commented in a 1959 article that "Until then I was simply using accepted techniques and relying on books and traditional patterns."

She attended the Haystack Mountain School of Crafts in Liberty, Maine where she studied with Jack Lenor Larsen in 1956. A staunch champion of her work, Larsen also commissioned Sekimachi to design a fabric for his production company.

Career 
She started experimenting with nylon monofilament hangings and weaving off loom by 1963. Her complex three-dimensional nylon hangings were featured several of the major exhibitions of the fiber arts movement, including Wall Hangings at the Museum of Modern Art (1969), Deliberate Entanglements at UCLA (1971) and the Biennale internationale de la tapisserie, Lausanne Switzerland in 1975 and 1983.

Sekimachi was part of the New Basketry movement of the late 1960s and early 1970s. Her later works comprised small woven baskets. She also created woven paperfold-like boxes with a Japanese influence. She later created baskets of linen warp ends and rice paper. Most recently, Sekimachi has incorporated objects found while beachcombing into her works, also creating jewelry.

Sekimachi taught in the Textile Arts Department at, her alma mater, California College of Arts and Crafts, starting in the Fall of 1975.  She also taught at the Adult Division of the City College of San Francisco (formerly San Francisco Community College) and at Lake Almanor, and the Town and Country Weavers.

Her work, Leaf Vessel, was acquired by the Smithsonian American Art Museum as part of the Renwick Gallery's 50th Anniversary Campaign. Her collaborative piece, with Bob Stocksdale, Marriage in Form was also acquired for the gallery. (with

Personal life
Sekimachi lives in Berkeley, California. In 1972, Sekimachi was married woodturner Bob Stocksdale.

Artworks

Skeletal Leaf Bowl Sculptures 
In 2015, Kay Sekimachi, along with her husband Bob Stocksdale showcased many of their artworks at the Bellevue Arts Museum in an exhibition called In The Realm of Nature. In this exhibition, Sekimachi shared one of her recent artworks at the time, skeletal leaf bowl sculptures. Before Sekimachi incorporated skeleton leaves into her sculptures, she began making paper bowls to expand her sculpting technique without using a loom. In the process of making paper bowls, Sekimachi would use Stocksdale’s bowls to shape her paper sculptures and wrap them in threads. Afterwards, she began doing workshops on paper bowls and shared in a 2001 interview for Archives of American Art, Smithsonian Institution that she would incorporate various materials in her paper bowls such as leaves and beakers. Eventually, Brooker Morey saw Sekimachi’s leaf bowls at the Palo Alto Cultural Center, shared how he made skeleton leaves, and offered her a set of leaves to incorporate in her leaf bowl sculptures.

Public collections 
Sekimachi's works are in many museum collections. These include: 
Metropolitan Museum of Art
Fine Arts Museums of San Francisco (FAMSF)
Smithsonian Institution
Musée des Arts Décoratifs, Paris
Honolulu Museum of Art Spalding House (formerly The Contemporary Museum, Honolulu)
Los Angeles County Museum of Art
Oakland Museum of California
Museum of Fine Arts, Houston

Exhibitions 
Sekimachi's work has been included in numerous exhibitions. Selected solo and small group exhibitions include: 
Parallel Views: Kay Sekimachi and Nancy Selvin (1982), California Crafts Museum at the Palo Alto Cultural Center, Palo Alto, California
Marriage in Form: Kay Sekimachi & Bob Stocksdale (1993), Palo Alto Cultural Center,  Palo Alto, California. The show subsequently toured to many venues across the United States. 
Kay Sekimachi: An Intimate Eye (2001), Mingei International Museum, San Diego, California 
Loom & Lathe: The Art of Kay Sekimachi and Bob Stocksdale (2008), Berkeley Art Center, Berkeley, California. The exhibition subsequently toured. 
Puako: Jewelry by Kay Sekimachi and Kiff Slemmons (2009), Velvet da Vinci Gallery, San Francisco
In the Realm of Nature: Bob Stocksdale and Kay Sekimachi (2014), Mingei International Museum, San Diego
Kay Sekimachi: Student, Teacher, Artist (2016), Textile Education Gallery, De Young Museum, San Francisco 
Bob Stocksdale & Kay Sekimachi: From the Collection of Forrest L. Merrill (2016), Fresno Art Museum, Fresno, California 
Kay Sekimachi Simple Complexity: Works from the Forrest L. Merrill Collection (2016-2017) at the Craft and Folk Art Museum, Los Angeles
Kay Sekimachi Master Weaver: Innovations in Forms and Materials (2018-2019) at the Fresno Art Museum, Fresno, California

Awards and honors
American Craft Council (ACC), Fellow, 1985
Craftsmen's Fellowship Grant, National Endowment for the Arts, 1974
Women’s Caucus for Art, Honor Award, 1997
American Craft Council, Gold Medal for Consummate Craftsmanship, 2002
Master of Medium Award, James Renwick Alliance, Washington, DC, 2007
Luminaries Award, Fuller Craft Museum, Brockton, Massachusetts, 2011

References

External links
In the Studio: Kay Sekimachi Institute of Contemporary Art, Boston
Kay Sekimachi, 1954 CCA/C Archives

1926 births
Living people
American artists of Japanese descent
Artists from San Francisco
Japanese-American internees
California College of the Arts alumni
20th-century American women artists
Women textile artists
American weavers
City College of San Francisco faculty
California College of the Arts faculty
20th-century textile artists
20th-century American artists
21st-century American artists
21st-century textile artists
21st-century American women artists
American women academics